Brampton is a village and former civil parish in the English county of Suffolk, around  north-east of Halesworth,  south of Beccles and  north-west of Southwold. In 1961 the parish had a population of 306. In 1987 the parish was merged with Stoven to form Brampton with Stoven parish and the mid-2005 population estimate for the expanded parish was 460. 

Stoven is immediately to the east of Brampton, Uggeshall to the south-east and Shadingfield to the north. The A145 road divides the village and passes the village church which is Grade I listed and dedicated to St Peter. Areas of housing, including at Brampton Street, are clustered on either side of the road throughout the parish area. Brampton Primary School serves the village and the surrounding area.

Brampton Hall is a listed country house built in 1794 of red brick for Rev Naunton Thomas Orgill Leman and the Leman family who had long associations in the area. The previous Brampton Hall burned down in 1733. A 16th century farmhouse was built on the same site, known as Brampton Old Hall. Both buildings are Grade II listed.

Notable residents
Humphrey Primatt (1734 – c1776), clergyman and animal rights writer.
Robert Leman (1799–1869), painter of landscapes and a member of the Norwich School of painters.
Edward Robinson (1839 – 1913), Member of the Western Australian Legislative Council for North Province from 1894 to 1896.
Thomas Curteis (1843 – 1914), first-class cricketer and clergyman.

References

External links

Villages in Suffolk
Former civil parishes in Suffolk
Waveney District